Mierzyn  is a suburb of Szczecin, which is one of the most populous villages in Poland. It is located in the municipality of Gmina Dobra, within Police County, West Pomeranian Voivodeship, in north-western Poland, close to the German border.

For the history of the region, see History of Pomerania.

References

Mierzyn